Takashi Kurihara (born 21 October 1947) is a Japanese professional golfer.

Kurihara played on the Japan Golf Tour, winning five times.

Professional wins (5)

Japan Golf Tour wins (5)

External links

Japanese male golfers
Japan Golf Tour golfers
Sportspeople from Tokyo
1947 births
Living people